The following is a list of the MTV Europe Music Award winners and nominees for Best World Stage Performance.

2000s

2010s

See also 
 MTV Video Music Award for Best Stage Performance

References

External links

MTV Europe Music Awards
Awards established in 2009